Austrochaperina novaebritanniae is a species of frog in the family Microhylidae. It is endemic to the island of New Britain, Papua New Guinea. It has also been found in a recently cleared rainforest. It is threatened by the logging of lowland forest but can be locally abundant.

References

novaebritanniae
Amphibians of Papua New Guinea
Endemic fauna of Papua New Guinea
Amphibians described in 2000
Taxa named by Richard G. Zweifel
Taxonomy articles created by Polbot